Rzuchów  is a village in the administrative district of Gmina Kornowac, within Racibórz County, Silesian Voivodeship, in southern Poland.

The village has a population of 1,000.

References

Villages in Racibórz County